Aşağı Ayrım is a ghost village in the Kalbajar District of Azerbaijan. The whole village was occupied by Armenian forces in 1993 during the First Nagorno-Karabakh war. When the Kalbajar region was returned to Azerbaijani control in late 2020, the only roofed buildings were a barn and an animal pen.

Etymology 
Aşağı means 'lower' in Azerbaijani language and Ayrım is the name of a nearby river that tumbles through the site and on down a steep, picturesque mountain valley. The name Ayrım is thought to signify the former presence of Ayrums in the vicinity.

History 
The village was predominantly a summer shepherding settlement accessing a series of yaylaq pastures including Məşədi Cəmilin yurdu, Qazıxanlı yaylağı, Fərhadyanan yurd, Qaraqaya yurdu, Səfərdüşən yurd, Tozluq yurdu, Hasarlı yurd, Dərə damlarının yurdu, Hümbətalı yurdu, Çiçəklitəpə yurdu and Qumluarxac yurdu. The whole area was occupied by Armenian forces in 1993 during the First Nagorno-Karabakh war. During the period of occupation, the village was left to fall apart. When the Kalbajar region was returned to Azerbaijani control in late 2020, the only roofed buildings were a barn and an animal pen. All other houses had been reduced to stone wall stubs. Access to the village is by an overgrown, unpaved track which can become impassable in snow.

References 

Populated places in Kalbajar District